David Sánchez (born 9 September 1968 in Guaynabo, Puerto Rico) is a Grammy-winning jazz tenor saxophonist from Puerto Rico.

Early life

Sanchez took up the conga when he was eight and started playing tenor saxophone at age 12.
His earliest influences were Afro-Caribbean and danza but also European and Latin classical. At the age of 12, Sanchez attended La Escuela Libre de Musica, which emphasized formal musical studies and classical European styles.

Discography

As leader
 The Departure (Columbia, 1994)
 Sketches of Dreams (Columbia, 1995)
 Street Scenes (Columbia, 1996)
 Obsesion (Columbia, 1998)
 Melaza (Columbia, 2000)
 Travesia (Columbia, 2001)
 Coral (Columbia, 2004)
 Cultural Survival (Concord Picante, 2008)
 Carib (Ropeadope, 2019)

As sideman
 Claudia Acuna, Wind from the South (Verve, 2000)
 Ray Barretto, Standards Rican-ditioned (Zoho, 2006)
 Kenny Barron, Spirit Song (Verve, 2000)
 Ignacio Berroa, Codes (Blue Note, 2006)
 Jimmy Bosch, Salsa Dura (Ryko, 1999)
 Randy Brecker, Randy Pop! (Piloo, 2015)
 Duduka Da Fonseca, Samba Jazz Fantasia (Art Music, 2002)
 Santi Debriano, Panamaniacs (Free Lance, 1994)
 Barbara Dennerlein, Junkanoo (Verve, 1997)
 Kenny Drew Jr., A Look Inside (Antilles, 1993)
 Kyle Eastwood, From There to Here (Columbia, 1998)
 Dizzy Gillespie, To Bird with Love (Telarc, 1992)
 Dizzy Gillespie, Bird Songs: The Final Recordings (Telarc, 1997)
 Edsel Gomez, Cubist Music (Zoho, 2006)
 Charlie Haden, Nocturne (Verve, 2001)
 Slide Hampton, Dedicated to Diz (Telarc, 1993)
 Kip Hanrahan, Exotica (American Clave, 1992)
 Roy Hargrove, Habana (Verve, 1997)
 Tom Harrell, The Art of Rhythm (RCA Victor, 1998)
 Stefon Harris, Ninety Miles (Concord Picante, 2011)
 Roy Haynes, Praise (Dreyfus, 1998)
 Roy Haynes, A Life in Time (Dreyfus, 2007)
 Giovanni Hidalgo, Villa Hidalgo (Messidor, 1992)
 La India, Llego la India Via Eddie Palmieri (Acid Jazz, 1992)
 Jonny King, The Meltdown (Enja, 1997)
 Ryan Kisor, On the One (Columbia, 1993)
 Mike Longo, I Miss You John (Consolidated Artists, 1995)
 Harold Lopez-Nussa, El Pais De Las Maravillas (World Village, 2011)
 Jason Miles, Miles to Miles (Narada, 2005)
 Mingus Big Band, Que Viva Mingus! (Dreyfus, 1997)
 Michael Philip Mossman, Springdance (Claves, 1995)
 Andy Narell, Tatoom (Heads Up, 2006)
 Nuyorican Soul, Nuyorican Soul (Talkin' Loud/Giant Step, 1997)
 Eddie Palmieri, Listen Here! (Concord Picante, 2005)
 Leon Parker, Above & Below (Epicure, 1994)
 Daniel Ponce, Chango Te Llama (Mango, 1991)
 Rachel Z, Trust the Universe (Columbia, 1993)
 Tony Reedus, People Get Ready (Sweet Basil, 1998)
 Claudio Roditi, Jazz Turns Samba (Groovin' High, 1994)
 Roberto Roena, Regreso (UP, 1987)
 Hilton Ruiz, Manhattan Mambo (Telarc, 1992)
 Hilton Ruiz, Heroes (Telarc, 1994)
 Hilton Ruiz, Hands On Percussion (RMM, 1995)
 Dave Samuels, Tjaderized (Verve, 1998)
 Antonio Sánchez, Migration (CAM Jazz, 2007)
 Antonio Sanchez, Live in New York at Jazz Standard (CAM Jazz, 2010)
 Arturo Sandoval, I Remember Clifford (GRP, 1992)
 Lalo Schifrin, Latin Jazz Suite (Aleph, 1999)
 Lalo Schifrin, Intersections (Aleph, 2001)
 SFJAZZ Collective, Live: SFJAZZ Center 2013 (SFJAZZ, 2013)
 SFJAZZ Collective, 10th Anniversary (SFJAZZ, 2014)
 SFJAZZ Collective, Music of Miles Davis & Original Compositions (SFJAZZ, 2017)
 Steve Turre, TNT (Telarc, 2001)
 Dave Valentin, Tropic Heat (GRP, 1994)
 Gabriel Vicéns, Days (Inner Circle Music, 2015)
 Kenny Werner, Democracy Live at the Blue Note (Half Note, 2006)
 Kenny Werner, Balloons (Half Note, 2011)
 Miguel Zenon, Looking Forward (Fresh Sound, 2001)

References

External links
David Sanchez Official Site 
Artist profile at Concord Records
David Sanchez and His Universe – Interview Published: March 1, 2004, By R.J. DeLuke, All About Jazz.com
"In Conversation with David Sánchez" by Ted Panken (Jazz.com)

Living people
People from Guaynabo, Puerto Rico
Puerto Rican jazz musicians
Columbia Records artists
Latin Grammy Award winners
Puerto Rican saxophonists
1968 births
21st-century saxophonists